The Batesville Sandstone is a geologic formation in northern Arkansas, United States, that dates to the Chesterian Series of the late Mississippian. The base of the Batesville Sandstone, named the Hindsville Limestone Member, unconformably lies on the Moorefield Formation.

Paleofauna

Brachiopods
Orthotetes
O. batesvillensis

Bryozoans
Archimedes
A. proutanus
Batostomella
B. parvula
Glyptopora
G. michelinia
Leioclema
Polypora
Tabulipora
T. miseri

Cephalopods
Goniatites
G. choctawensis
G. granosus
Lusitanites
L. subcircularis
Neoglyphioceras
N. caneyanum

See also

 List of fossiliferous stratigraphic units in Arkansas
 Paleontology in Arkansas

References

 

Carboniferous Arkansas
Carboniferous southern paleotropical deposits